Vandeikya is a local government area in Nigeria.

Vandeikya Local Government Council is located between latitude 7°5' and 7°15' north of the Equator and Longitude 9° and 9°6' east of Greenwich. It has a landmass of 183,939 square metres (0.7 sq miles) with a population of well over 80,288.

Vandeikya is in the South Eastern part of Benue State and shares boundaries with Obudu and Bekwara in Cross River State to the East, Ushongo to the North and Konshisha LGA to the West. There are twelve administrative council wards.

Vandeikya LGA was carved out of Gboko LGC in 1976. The indigenous community is the Tiv people who speak the Tiv language. The Vandeikya people are a hospitable group and are predominantly Christians with a few traditionalists.

Vandeikya Local Government area is dominated by undulating terrain with much of the area being below 183 m (600 ft) above the sea level. Surface drainage is generally good with almost all the rivers being seasonal, notably river Aya and river Be.

The climate is tropical sub humid with the mean annual rainfall of between 1,200 and 2,000 mm (47" and 79") averaging seven months in the year, while the mean annual temperature is 32.5 °C (90 °F). The wet season is from April to October or November while the dry season is November to March.

Agriculture is the mainstay of the people; with arable land for sheep, goats and cattle rearing. Over 80% of the population are directly engaged in the peasant farming of virtually all major food crops, with concentration on rice, sweet potatoes, cassava, sorghum, citrus, spices, pepper, groundnut and bambara nuts. The LGA is endowed with mineral deposits such as barites, kaoline and iron ores.

Being principally farmers, the major commercial engagements of the people in the area revolve around agricultural products. Presently, there are no major industries in the area; however there are many small scale cottage industries like rice milling, block making and furniture works and others. The settlement pattern is dispersed with thatched round houses.

References

Local Government Areas in Benue State